Gilles Müller was the defending champion, but chose not to participate.
Benjamin Becker defeated Dmitry Tursunov 4–6, 6–1, 6–4 in the final to win the title.

Seeds

Main draw

Finals

Top half

Bottom half

References
Main Draw
Qualifying Draw

Aegon Trophy - Singles
2012 Men's Singles